Wonder Women is a 1973 American action film directed by Robert Vincent O'Neil, and starring Nancy Kwan, Ross Hagen and Roberta Collins. Filming took place in the Philippines.

Cast
 Nancy Kwan as Dr. Tsu
 Ross Hagen as Mike Harber 
 Maria De Aragon as Linda
 Roberta Collins as Laura
 Tony Lorea as Paulson / Lorenzo
 Sid Haig as Gregorious
 Vic Diaz as Lapu-Lapu
 Claire Polan as Vera
 Shirley Washington as Maggie
 Gail Hansen as Gail
 Eleanor Siron as Mei-Ling
 Bruno Punzalan as Nono the Fisherman
 Joonee Gamboa as Won Ton Charlie
 Leila Benitez as Lillian Taylor
 Ross Rival as Ramon the Jai-Alai Player

References

Bibliography
 Michael Singer. Michael Singer's film directors: a complete guide. Lone Eagle, 1993.

External links

1973 films
1970s crime films
American crime films
1970s English-language films
Films directed by Robert Vincent O'Neil
Films shot in the Philippines
1970s American films